Allures is a 1961  American 16mm abstract motion picture directed by Jordan Belson.

Summary 
Using an evocative combination of sound and light effects, the film has been described by Belson as the "space-iest film that had been done until then", creating "a feeling of moving into the void".

Legacy 
In 2011, the experimental film was selected for listing in the National Film Registry by the Library of Congress.

See also 
1961 in film
Special effects

References

External links 
 

1961 films
1961 short films
1960s English-language films
American avant-garde and experimental films
United States National Film Registry films
1960s avant-garde and experimental films
1960s American films